Stylurus notatus, the elusive clubtail, is a species of clubtail in the family of dragonflies known as Gomphidae. It is found in North America.

The IUCN conservation status of Stylurus notatus is "LC", least concern, with no immediate threat to the species' survival. The population is stable.

References

External links

 

Gomphidae
Articles created by Qbugbot
Insects described in 1842